Rottnest Island Airport  is a small airport for light aircraft, situated about  from the main settlement at Thomson Bay, Rottnest Island and  northwest of Fremantle. Daily air services operate to the island. In the past these have been from Perth Airport, but in recent years have been mainly from Jandakot.

The single  runway runs east–west and is situated behind Thomsons Bay and south of Government House Lake. Part of the lake was resumed for the construction of the airport runway. The Oliver Hill railway line runs south of and parallel to the runway.

The airport opened in November 1930 and has been used regularly since then for private and small commercial operations, ferrying workers and holiday makers between Perth and the island.

Commercial services

At one stage, the  Perth to Rottnest flight was the world's shortest scheduled air route.

Woods Airways which was run by pioneer aviator Jimmy Woods, operated the Perth to Rottnest service from about 1948 with two war-surplus Royal Australian Air Force (RAAF) Avro Anson aircraft. The service closed in 1961 after concerns about the safety of the ageing aircraft and recurring conflict with the Department of Civil Aviation over minor infringements of regulations. In 14 years of operations, it had made more than 13,000 crossings.

Other services continued after Woods Airways departed and at various stages facilities were upgraded.

Woods Airways and its owner were considered synonymous with the airport and in 1987 State Tourism Minister Pam Beggs opened the renamed and upgraded Jimmy Woods Air Terminal in recognition.

MacRobertson Miller Airlines took over services after Wood's Airways using both DC-3 and Fokker F27 Friendship, until the route became uneconomical.

Rottnest Airlines (aka "Quokka Airlines") operated the service until 1999 when it was taken over by Frank Stynman who operates a four and six-seater daily service from Jandakot called Rottnest Air-Taxi. Flying time is from 12 to 15 minutes.

Airlines and destinations

Accidents and incidents
 On 12 November 2006 a light twin engine charter aircraft carrying the pilot and five passengers crashed on the edge of the salt lake adjoining the airport. The plane split in two from the impact and two passengers were hospitalised. All escaped with minor injuries. It is believed that the aircraft suffered an engine failure, and the pilot was not able to maintain control.

Gallery

See also
 List of airports in Western Australia
 Aviation transport in Australia

References

External links

 Airservices Aerodromes & Procedure Charts

Rottnest Island
Transport in Perth, Western Australia
Airports in Western Australia
Airports established in 1930